Victor Campenaerts (born 28 October 1991) is a Belgian racing cyclist, who currently rides for UCI ProTeam .

Career
He rode at the 2014 UCI Road World Championships. He was named in the startlist for the 2016 Vuelta a España and the start list for the 2017 Giro d'Italia.

In doing so, he became the fourth Belgian cyclist to hold the hour record, after Oscar Van den Eynde (1897–98), Ferdinand Bracke (1967–68) and Eddy Merckx (1972–2000).

Major results

2013
 1st  Time trial, UEC European Under-23 Road Championships
 1st  Time trial, National Under-23 Road Championships
 4th Overall Vuelta a la Comunidad de Madrid Sub 23
 8th Time trial, UCI Under-23 Road World Championships
 8th Antwerpse Havenpijl
2015
 1st Duo Normand (with Jelle Wallays)
 2nd Overall Tour de Wallonie
1st  Young rider classification
 4th Overall Ster ZLM Toer
 5th Time trial, National Road Championships
 10th Overall Boucles de la Mayenne
2016
 1st  Time trial, National Road Championships
 2nd  Time trial, UEC European Road Championships
2017
 1st  Time trial, UEC European Road Championships
 1st Stage 3 (ITT) Vuelta a Andalucía
 2nd Time trial, National Road Championships
 4th Overall Tour of Britain
 5th Chrono des Nations
 9th Brabantse Pijl
 10th Rund um Köln
2018
 1st  Time trial, UEC European Road Championships
 1st  Time trial, National Road Championships
 3rd  Time trial, UCI Road World Championships
2019
 Hour record: 55.089 km
 1st Stage 7 (ITT) Tirreno–Adriatico
 2nd Overall Tour of Belgium
1st Stage 4
 4th Time trial, National Road Championships
2020
 2nd Time trial, National Road Championships
 3rd  Time trial, UEC European Road Championships
 8th Time trial, UCI Road World Championships
2021
 1st Stage 15 Giro d'Italia
 3rd Time trial, National Road Championships
 3rd Overall Benelux Tour
 10th Road race, UEC European Road Championships
2022
 1st Grote Prijs Jef Scherens
 1st  Mountains classification, Tour de Wallonie
 3rd Time trial, National Road Championships
 3rd Circuit Franco–Belge
 4th Dwars door Vlaanderen
 5th Overall Tour of Belgium
 5th Omloop Het Nieuwsblad
 6th Le Samyn

Grand Tour general classification results timeline

References

External links
 
 
 
 
 

1991 births
Living people
Belgian male cyclists
Belgian Giro d'Italia stage winners
Cyclists from Antwerp
People from Wilrijk